Uresiphita insulicola is a moth in the family Crambidae. It is found in Australia, where it has been recorded from Lord Howe Island, Norfolk Island and Queensland.

The wingspan is about 40 mm. The forewings are dark brown and the hindwings are orange with broad black tips.

References

Moths described in 1918
Pyraustinae